Rodney Christopher O'Donnell (born 16 August 1956) is a former Ireland international rugby union player. He made his Ireland debut in Australia in 1979 when Ireland won both tests (the first Northern Hemisphere side to win 2 tests in the Southern Hemisphere). He toured South Africa in 1980 with the British Lions and at the time played club rugby for St. Mary's College RFC. His rugby career was ended by a neck injury suffered on the Lions tour.

Notes 

1956 births
Living people
Irish rugby union players
Ireland international rugby union players
British & Irish Lions rugby union players from Ireland
St Mary's College RFC players
People educated at St Mary's College, Dublin